Oatsville is an unincorporated community in Gibson and Pike counties, in the U.S. state of Indiana.

History
A post office was established at Oatsville in 1876, and remained in operation until it was discontinued in 1903.

The city is where the infamous Tri-state Tornado finally dissipated at about 4:30pm local time after tracking through Missouri, Illinois and Indiana. The tornado is thought to have been an F5, and was likely at F0-F1 intensity as it dissipated.

Geography
Oatsville is located at

References

Unincorporated communities in Gibson County, Indiana
Unincorporated communities in Pike County, Indiana
Unincorporated communities in Indiana